USS LST-18 was a United States Navy  used exclusively in the Asiatic-Pacific Theater during World War II and manned by a United States Coast Guard crew. Like many of her class, she was not named and is properly referred to by her hull designation.

Construction
LST-18 was laid down on 1 October 1942, at Pittsburgh, Pennsylvania by the Dravo Corporation; launched on 15 February 1943; sponsored by Miss Ruth Watt; placed in reduced commission for transportation to be fitted out; and fully commissioned on 26 April 1943.

Service history
During the war LST-18 served exclusively and extensively in the Asiatic-Pacific Theater from September 1943 until November 1945.

LST-18 was then floated down the Ohio and Mississippi rivers from 19–25 April 1943, arriving at New Orleans on the latter date. When she entered commissioned service there were only 7 officers and 67 enlisted men in the original crew. After tests and maneuvers at St. Andrews, Florida, she returned to New Orleans on 14 May 1943, for post-shakedown availability. She was then assigned to LST Flotilla 7, Group 21, Division 41.

LST-18 left Galveston, Texas, on 25 May 1943, with Convoy HK 186 headed for Key West, Florida, where she arrived on 29 May 1943.

On 1 June 1943, she got underway for the Canal Zone. Arriving at Coca Sola, Canal Zone, on 14 June 1943, Commander Clarence H. Peterson, USCG, with two officers and 13 enlisted men reported aboard for duty to the staff of Group 21, LST Flotilla 7 and LST-18 was designated flagship for the group.

She then travelled to Australia, where she left Caloundra, Queensland, on 23 August 1943, en route to Townsville, Queensland, with Convoy QL 8, arriving on 26 August. From there she left two days later with Convoy TN 147 en route to Milne Bay, Territory of Papua, where she arrived on 31 August 1943.

She then proceeded to Milne Bay, New Guinea, arriving on 2 September 1943, for ten days of beaching operations and loading for the first trip in the forward areas.

Eastern New Guinea operation

LST-18 participated in the landing at Scarlet Beach during the Battle of Finschhafen from 22–24 September 1943.

Bismarck Archipelago operation

LST-18 participated in the Cape Gloucester landings, New Britain at the end of December 1943 and January 1944. She then assisted in the Admiralty Islands landings at the end of March until 1 April 1944.

Hollandia and Western New Guinea operation

LST-18 remained busy participating in the Hollandia operation at the end of April and the beginning of May 1944, the Toem-Wakde-Sarmi area in the middle of May 1944, the Biak Island invasion in the middle of June 1944, the Noemfoor Island invasion at the beginning to the middle of July 1944, the Cape Sansapor landings at the end of July and the beginning of August 1944, and the Morotai landings in the middle of  September 1944.

Leyte operation

From the Western New Guinea area LST-18 moved to the Philippines to participate in General Douglas MacArthur's promised liberation of the islands from the Japanese occupation starting with the Leyte landings from the middle of October until the end of November 1944.

LST-18 finished out her combat career participating in the Battle of Luzon Lingayen Gulf landings from the beginning to the middle of January 1945, the Palawan Island landings at the beginning of March 1945, and then the Visayan Islands landings at the end of March and the beginning of April 1945.

In carrying out these invasions, LST-18 was under attack on eight different occasions by enemy planes, shore installations and torpedo. No casualties were suffered by the ship's crew, but one Army passenger was killed aboard, the result of an enemy strafing run. She also evacuated 617 ambulatory cases and 179 stretcher cases from the various beachheads. There were three deaths aboard; one Army enlisted who had been brought on board for treatment; one Army passenger who died of wounds during an air attack (mentioned earlier) and one prisoner of war who was brought on board for treatment. Up to the time of the ship's return to San Francisco on 16 December 1945, 291 enlisted men and 33 officers had served aboard at various intervals.

Postwar career
After the cessation of hostilities on 14 August 1945, the LST made one support landing at Brunei Bay, Borneo, on 25 August 1945, and then completed her tour of duty by taking a load of occupation troops to Taku, China.

LST-18 performed occupation duty in the Far East until early November 1945. She returned to the United States and was decommissioned on 3 April 1946. She was struck from the Navy list on 17 April 1946 and was sold to the Suwannee Fruit & Steamship Co., of Jacksonville, Florida, on 31 October 1946 for conversion to merchant service.

Awards
American Campaign Medal
Asiatic-Pacific Campaign Medal with seven battle stars
World War II Victory Medal
Navy Occupation Medal with "ASIA" clasp
China Service Medal
Philippine Presidential Unit Citation
Philippine Liberation Medal

References

Bibliography

External links

 

LST-1-class tank landing ships of the United States Navy
World War II amphibious warfare vessels of the United States
Ships built in Pittsburgh
1943 ships
United States Navy ships crewed by the United States Coast Guard
Ships built by Dravo Corporation